The 21st Marching Regiment of Foreign Volunteers was a formation of the French Foreign Legion from 1939 to June 26, 1940.



History
In order to serve France, foreign volunteers formed the regiment in 1939.

Organization

See also

2nd Foreign Infantry Regiment
Marching Regiments of Foreign Volunteers

Notes

References

Defunct French Foreign Legion units
Military units and formations established in 1939
Military units and formations disestablished in 1940